Claudemir do Nascimento Santos is a Paralympian athlete from Brazil competing mainly in category T46 sprint events.

Claudemir competed at the 2008 Summer Paralympics in Beijing.  He won a silver medal in theT42-46 4 × 100 m as part of the Brazilian team, after failing to medal in the T46 200m.

Reference
 profile on paralympic.org

External links
 

Paralympic athletes of Brazil
Athletes (track and field) at the 2008 Summer Paralympics
Paralympic silver medalists for Brazil
Brazilian male sprinters
Living people
Year of birth missing (living people)
Place of birth missing (living people)
Medalists at the 2008 Summer Paralympics
Paralympic medalists in athletics (track and field)
Athletes from Rio de Janeiro (city)
21st-century Brazilian people